Erronea cylindrica is a species of sea snail, a cowry, a marine gastropod mollusk in the family Cypraeidae, the cowries.

Description
 The shells reach  of length. These cowries have a surface smooth and shiny. They are cylindrical, their basic coloration is pale brown or greenish, with irregular dark brown patches on the dorsum. The extremities are brown too. The lateral margins and the flat base are white.

Habitat
They are living in warm tropical and subtropical waters, from intertidal zone to the deep reef, in coral reefs or sandy surfaces. Often they can be encountered in the low intertidal zone near the line of reef. As they fear light, during the day they are usually hidden beneath the reef rocks and coral caves. At dawn or dusk they feed,  mainly on sponges, algae, small crustaceans and polyps of corals. Mantle and foot are well developed, with external antennae.

Distribution
This species is found throughout the tropical Western and Central Pacific Ocean and in the Indian Ocean, in seas along Thailand, NW Australia, Philippines, New Zealand, New Caledonia, Guam and Madagascar.

References

External links
 Biolib

cylindrica
Gastropods described in 1778